Lou Maranzana (born c. 1947) is a former American football coach. He served as the head football coach at and Bucknell University in Lewisburg, Pennsylvania from 1989 to 1994, compiling a career college football coaching record of 26–38. He was an assistant coach at Bloomsburg University of Pennsylvania under head coach George Landis from 1982 and 1985 and moved to Bucknell when Landis took the head coaching post there in 1986. Maranzana played college football at Dartmouth College.

Head coaching record

College

References

Year of birth missing (living people)
1940s births
Living people
Bloomsburg Huskies football coaches
Bucknell Bison football coaches
Dartmouth Big Green football coaches
Dartmouth Big Green football players
High school football coaches in Florida